How Great Is Your Love may refer to:

How Great Is Your Love (Sean Ardoin album), 1999
"How Great Is Your Love", a song by Girl's Generation from The Boys, 2011
"How Great Is Your Love", a song by MercyMe from Almost There, 2001
"How Great Is Your Love", a song by Passion featuring Kristian Stanfill, 2017

See also
How Deep Is Your Love (disambiguation)